Bridgette C. Gordon (born April 27, 1967) is an American retired female professional basketball player. She was a member of the United States women's national basketball team, that claimed the gold medal at the 1988 Olympic Games in Seoul, South Korea.

In 2007, Gordon was elected to the Women's Basketball Hall of Fame, located in Knoxville, Tennessee.

USA Basketball
Gordon was selected to be a member of the team representing the US at the 1987 World University Games held in Zagreb, Yugoslavia. The USA team won four of the five contests. In the opening game against Poland, Gordon was the leading scorer for the US with 18 points. After winning their next game against Finland, the USA faced the host team Yugoslavia. The game went to overtime, but Yugoslavia prevailed, 93–89. The USA faced China in the next game. They won 84–83, but they needed to win by at least five points to remain in medal contention. They won the final game against Canada to secure fifth place.

Gordon continued on the USA national team when the team played at the 1988 Olympics, held in Seoul, South Korea. She averaged 8.8 points per game, including 20 points against Yugoslavia to help the team win all five games and earn the gold medal.

Gordon also played with the USA team at the 1991 Pan American Games. The team finished with a record of 4–2, but managed to win the bronze medal. The USA team lost a three-point game to Brazil, then responded with wins over Argentina and Cuba, earning a spot in the medal round. The next game was a rematch against Cuba, and this time the team from Cuba won a five-point game. The USA beat Canada easily to win the bronze. Gordon averaged 11.3 points per game.

Career statistics

WNBA

Regular season

Source

|-
| style="text-align:left" | 1997
| style="text-align:left" | Sacramento
| style="background:#D3D3D3" |28° || style="background:#D3D3D3" |28° || 35.0 || .433 || .275 || .785 || 4.8 || 2.8 || 1.4 || .3 || 3.0 || 13.0
|-
| style="text-align:left" | 1998
| style="text-align:left" | Saramento
| 22 || 5 || 11.5 || .391 || .000 || .563 || 1.3 || .4 || .4 || .0 || 1.4 || 2.7
|-
| style="text-align:left" | Career
| style="text-align:left" | 2 years, 1 team
| 50 || 33 || 24.7 || .426 || .229 || .756 || 3.3 || 1.7 || .9 || .2 || 2.3 || 8.5

Awards and honors

 1989—Winner of the Honda Sports Award for basketball
 2x FIBA Women's European Champions Cup (current EuroLeague) with Italian club Pool Comense (1993–94, 1994–95)

References

External links
Bridgette Gordon WNBA Stats at Basketball Reference
Bridgette Gordon International Stats at Basketball Reference

1967 births
Living people
African-American basketball players
All-American college women's basketball players
American women's basketball players
Basketball players at the 1988 Summer Olympics
Basketball players at the 1991 Pan American Games
Basketball players from Florida
Fenerbahçe women's basketball players
Forwards (basketball)
Medalists at the 1988 Summer Olympics
Olympic gold medalists for the United States in basketball
Pan American Games bronze medalists for the United States
Pan American Games medalists in basketball
People from DeLand, Florida
Sacramento Monarchs players
Sportspeople from Volusia County, Florida
Tennessee Lady Volunteers basketball players
Medalists at the 1991 Pan American Games
21st-century African-American people
21st-century African-American women
20th-century African-American sportspeople
20th-century African-American women
20th-century African-American people
United States women's national basketball team players